Bridge Trafford is a hamlet and former civil parish, now in the parish of Mickle Trafford and District, situated near to Chester, in the unitary authority of Cheshire West and Chester and ceremonial county of Cheshire, England. At the 2001 census it had a population of 33. The civil parish was abolished in 2015 to form Mickle Trafford and District.

It is believed that the Roman road from Chester to Wilderspool (now part of Warrington) passed through the parish. In 1991 a Roman bronze brooch was found in the parish.

Immediately to the south of the hamlet the River Gowy is crossed by Trafford Bridge. A stone bridge was first built here in 1410 and there was probably a wooden bridge before that. After the Civil War the bridge needed repairs and these were carried out in 1648.

References

Notes

Bibliography

External links

Villages in Cheshire
Former civil parishes in Cheshire
Cheshire West and Chester